Bình Dương is a province of Vietnam. It is located in the Southeast region of the country and the Southern Key Economic Zone 2, bordering Bình Phước province to the north, Ho Chi Minh City (HCMC) to the south and southwest, Tây Ninh province to the west, and Đồng Nai province to the east. The province was created from Sông Bé province on 1 January 1997.

Bình Dương is considered to be the gateway to HCMC, the economic cultural centre of the country. Endowed with convenient geography conditions, Bình Dương has an extremely important road network. Major highways of the country cross Bình Dương such as National Road (NR) no. 13, NR no. 14, the HCMC Route and the Trans-Asian Highway. Bình Dương is only  from Tân Sơn Nhất International Airport and important ports. All of the advantages create favourable conditions to achieve social and economic development.

Geography
Bình Dương province is situated on relatively level terrain, and is crossed by the Saigon, Đồng Nai, and Bé rivers. It also has some hills. Bình Dương can be seen from the Lái Thiêu central church. Although Bình Dương is flat, it is higher than Ho Chi Minh City. Across Bình Dương there are many different topographic regions, including low mountainous terrain with slight undulation, flat plains and alluvial valleys. There are some low mountains, including Châu Thới in Dĩ An and Cậu mountain (also called Lấp Vò) in Dầu Tiếng district and some low hills. Natural effects have created many different types of landform including worn areas, accumulative areas (due to the deposition of corrosive materials in the flow) and some areas that are worn, accumulative and depositional at the same time. This is due to rainfall and the flow affecting the ground, with the effects of wind, temperature, climate, the erosion and collapse due to gravity of the geology. The impact took place over millions of years.

Climate
Bình Dương's climate, like the climate of the rest of the Southeast region, is hot and rainy, with high humidity. It has a tropical monsoon climate, divided into two distinct dry and wet seasons. The rainy season usually starts in May and lasts until late October. In the early months of the rainy season, there are regular short but heavy showers, while July, August, and September usually have continuous rain, sometimes lasting for 1–2 days. Bình Dương seldom experiences typhoons and is only otherwise affected by local storms. In the dry season, the average annual humidity is between 76–80%, with the highest at 86% in September and the lowest at 66% in February. The average rainfall each year is 1,800–2,000 mm, but rainfall at Sở Sao crossroads in Bình Dương regularly measures up to 2,113.3 mm.

Demographics

Originally, the area now known as Bình Dương was heavily forested, and was dominated by peoples of the Xtiêng, Chơ Ro, Mnong, and Khmer Krom ethnic groups. In the 17th century, however, ethnic Vietnamese settlers arrived in the region from the east. Most were peasants, seeking to escape poverty by gaining land of their own. There were also a number of refugees from a war between two feudal houses. In 1698, there were enough people in the area that a prominent Vietnamese general was sent to establish official institutions and enforce law. From that point, Bình Dương developed rapidly, with extensive clearance of forests to make room for crops. The province is now dominated by ethnic Vietnamese.

Administrative divisions
Bình Dương is subdivided into nine district-level sub-divisions:
 4 districts:
 Bàu Bàng
 Bắc Tân Uyên
 Dầu Tiếng
 Phú Giáo
 1 district-level town:
 Bến Cát (recently upgraded from district status)
 4 provincial cities:
 Thủ Dầu Một (capital)
 Dĩ An
 Thuận An
 Tân Uyên (recently upgraded from district-level status)

They are further subdivided into 4 commune-level towns (or townlets), 42 communes, and 45 wards.

Economy
The area is considered to be good cropland, and agriculture is an important industry in the province. Bình Dương is also home to a significant manufacturing industry, and in the first half of 2004, the province had the second highest levels of foreign investment in Vietnam. Nike, Adidas, H&M and McDonald's have set up factories to manufacture goods they sell locally and abroad in the province. The southern Dĩ An and Thuận An wards are highly urbanised and are now encompassed within the Ho Chi Minh City metropolitan area.

In the first half of 2018, foreign investment in Bình Dương totaled US$850 million, more than 60% of the target. Since 2016, the province has attracted US$5.7 billion worth of FDI. At its current growth rate, Bình Dương will exceed the target of US$7 billion set for its 5-year plan until 2020. In 2019, Bình Dương has targeted a GRDP of 8.4–8.6% and a per capita income of VND140 million (more than US$6,030).

Thủ Dầu Một is the economic and administrative center of Bình Dương province. Located in the southern key economic region and the Ho Chi Minh City region, Thủ Dầu Một lies on HCM City's radial arterial road and the HCM City-Thủ Dầu Một-Chơn Thành Expressway. The administration of Thủ Dầu Một has exerted efforts to increase the proportion of services and industry in the city.

Japan is currently the largest foreign investor among 64 countries and territories investing in the southern province of Bình Dương with 304 valid projects worth nearly US$5.7 billion.

List of Bình Dương's industrial cluster and industrial parks:
Vietnam – Singapore Industrial Park (VSIP)
Việt Hương 1, 2 Industrial Park
Thới Hoà Industrial Park
Tân Đông Hiệp A and B Industrial Parks
Sóng Thần 1, 2 and 3 Industrial Parks
Rạch Bắp Industrial Park
Nam Tân Uyên Industrial Park
Mỹ Phước 1, 2 and 3 Industrial Parks
Mai Trung Industrial Park
Ascendas – Protrade Industrial Park
Kim Huy Industrial Park
Tân Bình industrial Park
Đông An 1 and 2 Industrial Parks
Phú Gia Industrial Park
Bầu Bàng Industrial Park
Bình An Industrial Park
Bình Dương Industrial Park
Đại Đăng Industrial Park
Đất Cuốc Industrial Park
Thanh An Industrial cluster
Uyên Hưng Industrial cluster
Tân Mỹ Industrial cluster
Beautiful City Industrial cluster
Phú Chánh Industrial cluster
Tân Đông Hiệp Industrial cluster
Bình Chuẩn Industrial cluster
An Thạnh industrial cluster

Tourism
As one of the important elements, the system of cultural institutions has gotten development at the same time as main works in Bình Dương New City. Speeding up investment in cultural institutions in the new city has helped the local residents and tourists to have more selections for their entertainment demand. Over the past 5 years, Bình Dương's tourism sector has reached stable growth with an annual average increase of 17% in revenue and 0.5% in the number of tourists. The Provincial People's Committee is actively implementing projects on ecotourism and traditional craft village tourism development along with Đồng Nai province to bring into full play and preserve the local historical and cultural features. Between 2016 and 2020, the tourism sector will strive to account for around 27.2% of the local economic structure. The province will focus on effectively tapping geographic advantages. Some tourist potentials include diversifying tourism types and tourism promotion activities and strengthening tourism cooperation with HCM city and other localities in the region. Bình Dương is now home to ecotourism zones, historical-cultural relics together with traditional craft villages on things such as lacquer, pottery and wooden shoes.

According to VOV, eight must-visit places in Bình Dương (mainly in Thủ Dầu Một) are:
Phú An bamboo village (Bến Cát)
Bình Dương New City Park (Thủ Dầu Một)
Hội Khánh Temple (Thủ Dầu Một)
Phú Cường Cathedral (Thủ Dầu Một)
Tay Tang Pagoda (Thủ Dầu Một)
Đại Nam Văn Hiến (Thủ Dầu Một)
Thủy Châu tourist site (Dĩ An)
Wind and Water Cafe (Thủ Dầu Một)

Festival

First Full Moon of the New Year Festival (also called Lady Thiên Hậu Pagoda Festival)
On this occasion, thousands of visitors flocked into Thủ Dầu Một since the 13th of the first lunar month to celebrate the first full moon on the 15th day of the lunar calendar. During this festival, the pagoda attracts thousands of people each day who come to pray for luck, happiness and success. It is common to see people eating vegan food and drinking water. The First Full Moon of the New Year Festival in Bình Dương was more special than in other provinces and Ho Chi Minh City because local businesses and residents give visitors free food, water and motorbike repair services.
Japanese Festival (held in Bình Dương New City)
Ky Yen Festival (twice a year on 15 April and in Làyuè of lunar calendar)
Ông Bổn Temple Festival (the second day of Zhēngyuè in lunar calendar in spring, and 4 July in lunar calendar in fall)
Dragon Boat Rowing Festival on Saigon river (30 April, 1 May, or 2 September)
Lái Thiêu Fruit Festival (Thuận An City)

International relations

Sister cities
Bình Dương is twinned with: 

Daejon, South Korea (17 May 2005)

Cooperation and friendship 
In addition to its twin city, Bình Dương cooperates with: 

Kratié, Cambodia
Champasak, Laos (13 November 2006)
Guangzhou, China (21 August 2013)
Emilia-Romagna, Italy (16 October 2013)
Yamaguchi Prefecture, Japan (25 December 2014)
Eindhoven, Netherlands (16 January 2015)
East Flanders, Belgium (14 October 2015)
Emmen, Netherlands (17 November 2015)
Oryol Oblast, Russia (7 July 2017)

Gallery

References

External links

Official Bình Dương province website
 Bình Dương news website

 
Southeast (Vietnam)
Provinces of Vietnam